Nikita Sergeyevich Dorofeyev (born 15 February 1998) is a Russian football player. He mostly plays as a central midfielder, but can also appear on left or right midfield.

Club career
He made his debut in the Russian Professional Football League for FC Lokomotiv-Kazanka Moscow on 19 July 2017 in a game against FC Znamya Truda Orekhovo-Zuyevo.

He made his debut for the senior squad of FC Lokomotiv Moscow on 25 September 2019 in a Russian Cup game against FC Baltika Kaliningrad. He was one of the two players to miss his shot in the penalty shootout that Lokomotiv lost.

He made his Russian Football National League debut for FC Shinnik Yaroslavl on 2 August 2020 in a game against FC Torpedo Moscow.

References

External links
 

1998 births
Footballers from Moscow
Living people
Russian footballers
FC Lokomotiv Moscow players
FC Shinnik Yaroslavl players
FC Olimp-Dolgoprudny players
FC Sokol Saratov players
Association football midfielders
Russian First League players
Russian Second League players